The Tour Cycliste Féminin de la Drôme was an event on the women's elite cycle racing calendar.

Winners

References

Cycle races in France
Women's road bicycle races